Daryle Lamont Jenkins (born July 22, 1968) is an American political activist, best known for founding One People's Project, an organization based in New Brunswick, New Jersey. Jenkins serves as its executive director, and has been credited with pioneering the practice of doxing.

Early life
Jenkins was born in Newark, New Jersey and raised in nearby Somerset, New Jersey. He graduated from Franklin High School and served in the United States Air Force. Upon returning from the service, he became a part of the punk rock movement, producing two public access programs about the scene as well as political activism, which caused some conflict with his position as a reporter and an editor for local newspapers.

Career
Jenkins has been documenting and writing about right-wing individuals and organizations since 1989, while he was still serving in the Air Force as a police officer. In 2000, he founded One People's Project out of a counter-protest to a rally in Morristown, New Jersey by Richard Barrett of the Nationalist Movement.  

After anti-abortion activist Neal Horsley published a website that compiled a list of almost 200 active abortion providers and celebrated any act of violence against the providers and encouraged site visitors to take matters into their own hands, Planned Parenthood sued Horsley and other anti-abortion activists that produced similar tactics with "wanted"-style posters of abortion doctors as being a threat to them.

Although Planned Parenthood won the case they lost on appeal when a federal court ruled that the First Amendment protected the Nuremberg Files. That verdict — although overturned on appeal — paved the way for what would eventually be called "doxxing" in 2001, according to Jenkins in an interview. "We didn't see it as a weapon," he said. "We never used it as a threat. We wanted to be open about what we saw and this allowed us to be open."

One People's Project gained a reputation of publicly documenting hate groups, and their activities, but in addition Jenkins has also gained a reputation for helping neo-Nazis leave those circles behind, among them Bryon Widner, whose story was featured in the documentary Erasing Hate (2011), which has been turned into a feature-length motion picture titled Skin (2018).

While One People's Project and Jenkins had gained some notoriety over the years, it was not until Donald Trump's campaign for the presidency and eventual victory that put him, the organization, and the entire Antifa movement into the spotlight. Jenkins has appeared on numerous television news programs, articles, and documentaries, notably The Montel Williams Show, A Current Affair, The Rachel Maddow Show, and on AM Joy with Joy Reid. In 2018, the documentary Alt-Right: Age of Rage, which features Jenkins confronting white nationalist Richard Spencer, premiered at South by Southwest. Jenkins identifies as an anarchist.

References

External links
 

1968 births
Living people
American anti-fascists
American political activists
Franklin High School (New Jersey) alumni
People from Newark, New Jersey
People from Franklin Township, Somerset County, New Jersey